Alan Alfred Campbell Lind  (20 April 1913 – 5 December 1988) was an Australian politician.

His uncle was Sir Albert Eli Lind, a long-serving state MP. After his marriage in 1938 Lind became a schoolteacher, and saw active service in the Second World War. At the end of the war (1945) he returned to school teaching in Mildura. In 1952 he was elected to the Victorian Parliament's Legislative Assembly. After his electoral defeat in 1955 he returned to teaching. In 1969 he was returned to the Assembly as the member for Dandenong, serving until his retirement in 1979. He was held in unusually hight esteem by his colleagues from all political parties for his unrelenting and dedicated work for his constituents and the State of Victoria. He was honoured as an Officer of the Order of Australia in 1978.

Early life
He was born in Bairnsdale to baker Willie Arthur Lind and Nora Madeline Smith. He attended Bairnsdale Primary, Bairnsdale High School and then Melbourne High School. After Leaving school he graduated as a teacher from the Melbourne Teachers' College.
At the age of 25, on 16 April 1938, he married Lilian McCann (1914-1972), with whom he had three children. (On 28 August 1977 he married Marie McKenzie, née Lindemann.)

War Service
From 1942 to 1944 Lind served with the second AIF 2/12th Field Regiment within the 9th Division Artillery for three years as a gunner in the Middle East and later in New Guinea.

Professions and Career
From 1945 to 1952 Alan Lind was appointed a teacher at the Victorian country border town of Mildura on the Murray River near the New South Wales and South Australian borders.
Alan Lind began his political involvement as a member of the Liberal-Country Party in 1939 in a newly formed branch at Stratford in Gippsland. Sometime between 1939 and 1952 he switched to the Australian Labor Party. In 1952 he was elected to the Victorian Legislative Assembly as the Labor member for Mildura.
Lind was defeated in the state election of 1955. He returned to teaching. Later he was appointed principal of the state school at Hallam from 1964 to 1969.
In 1969 he was elected to the state seat of Dandenong, an office he held until 1979 when he retired.

He was chairman of the government's bipartisan Public Works Committee. This involved decisions about dams and powerlines, Dartmouth Water, the Loy Yang power station, extension to tramlines and the salinity of the Murray River. He was also sometime shadow minister for Health.

Supported Community Organisations
 W.J.Christie Centre for the intellectually disabled in Mildura. Lind was the foundation chairman.
 Wallara Day Training Centre for the intellectually disabled. Lind was the founding president of the centre and remained its "revered president" for 25 years. He visited the centre every day.
 Carry On (Vic) - an organisation which looked after the dependents of ex-servicemen and women. Lind worked with this group in Mildura. Years later, in 1971, he founded the branch in Dandenong and "continued to serve those in need".He received the first ever Certificate of Appreciation from this organisation.
 Gateway Grouping - an organisation which assists the intellectually handicapped. Lind was an active member.
 Doveton High School Council - Lind was an active participant.
 Dandenong Workers Club - Lind was a foundation member and supportive advisor.
 Dandenong Cooperative Housing Society Ltd - Lind was a director until his death.
 Dandenong Community Credit Union - Lind was an original founder.

Awards and Tributes
In 1978 Lind was appointed an Officer of the Order of Australia (AO) for services to the community.

IN 1978 Lind was named Citizen of the Year by the Dandenong City Council.

On 8 December 1988 sixteen Members of the Victorian Parliament from the Labor, Liberal and National Parties paid detailed and significant tributes to Alan Lind. 
Said Acting Premier Bob Fordham (Labor Party):"Alan .. (was a man of) deep compassion and social commitment ... Alan was an immensely popular figure who never forgot that politics was all about looking after people". 
The leader of the opposition Jeff Kennett stated that "Alan Lind ... was a gentleman of the highest order. He was never interested in politics or life for personal gain and saw his role as a grassroots representative of people". 
The treasurer Rob Jolly declared that ...he never said a bad word about anyone, and no one ever said a bad word about Alan Lind. 
Mr Austin (Ripon) spoke of Alan Lind's ... magnificent sense of humour.
--
John Woods - Editor of the Dandenong Journal - There have not been too many people in this world who didn't have any enemies. Allan Alfred Campbell Lind was one of them. No matter what their race, religion or political leanings, Allan Lind was a friend to all; and they to him.

References

1913 births
1988 deaths
Australian Labor Party members of the Parliament of Victoria
Members of the Victorian Legislative Assembly
Officers of the Order of Australia
20th-century Australian politicians
Victoria (Australia) politicians
People from Bairnsdale
People educated at Melbourne High School
Australian Army personnel of World War II
Australian schoolteachers
Military personnel from Victoria (Australia)